Isaac Carbonell (born 6 August 1994) is a Spanish racing cyclist. He rode at the 2014 UCI Road World Championships.

References

External links
 

1994 births
Living people
Spanish male cyclists
Place of birth missing (living people)
People from Sitges
Sportspeople from the Province of Barcelona
Cyclists from Catalonia
21st-century Spanish people